The 2011 E3 Prijs Vlaanderen – Harelbeke took place on 26 March 2011. It was the 54th edition of the international classic E3 Prijs Vlaanderen – Harelbeke and is rated as a 1.HC event on the UCI Europe Tour. This edition was won by 's rider Fabian Cancellara.

Results

References

External links

E3 Prijs Vlaanderen - Harelbeke
E3 Harelbeke
2011 in Belgian sport